Sigvard Oscar Fredrik, Prince Bernadotte, Count of Wisborg (7 June 1907 – 4 February 2002) born as, and until 1934 known as, Prince Sigvard of Sweden, Duke of Uppland, was a member of the Swedish Royal Family and a successful industrial designer by profession.

He was the second son of the future King Gustaf VI Adolf and his first wife, Princess Margaret of Connaught, eldest daughter of Prince Arthur, Duke of Connaught and Strathearn and granddaughter of Britain's Queen Victoria. He was a Prince of Sweden from birth, but was excluded from the line of succession in 1934 when he married a woman of unequal rank, a violation of provisions prohibiting marriages between a Prince and a "private man's daughter", in force at the time, contained in both the 1809 Instrument of Government and the 1810 Act of Succession, and, in addition, he lost his princely and ducal titles as decided by the King in Council. As per the king's wishes he was then to be called only Mr. Sigvard Bernadotte in Sweden. In 1951 he was granted Luxembourgian titles of nobility, the interpretation of which remained a point of contention with the Royal Court for the rest of his life, Bernadotte having formally declared in 1983 that his title was Prince Sigvard Bernadotte.

He was a paternal uncle of King Carl XVI Gustaf of Sweden and a maternal uncle of Queen Margrethe II of Denmark and Queen Anne-Marie of Greece.

Professional life
An industrial designer, Bernadotte was known for designing everything from luxurious silver objects for Georg Jensen to everyday-use household items in plastic.

Among his iconic designs were the Red Clara opener; EKA Swede 38 folding knife; the Margrethe bowl – named for his niece Queen Margrethe II of Denmark; the Bernadotte jug, and the Facit Private typewriter. He also designed glasses frames.

He worked as an assistant director at MGM in Culver City, California and served as a technical advisor on the 1937 film The Prisoner of Zenda.

He appeared briefly in the 1968 Italian mondo film Sweden: Heaven and Hell. His work in industrial design at Bernadotte Design AB is featured, along with select items from his portfolio.

Marriages
He married Erica Maria Regina Rosalie Patzek (1911–2007) on 8 March 1934. She was the daughter of German businessman Anton Patzek and his wife Maria Anna Lála. The wedding took place in Caxton Hall in London and the witnesses were the bride's brother Georg Patzek and a lawyer Mr Gordon. Sigvard lost all royal privileges following the wedding and started his silver design business. They were divorced on 14 October 1943.

Bernadotte remarried a Danish woman Sonja Christensen Robbert (1909–2004) on 26 October 1943 and they were divorced on 6 June 1961. They had one son: Michael (b. 21 August 1944) who married Christine Wellhofer on 6 February 1976, and they in turn have one daughter and one granddaughter.

Lastly, Bernadotte married Swedish actress Marianne Lindberg Tchang on 30 July 1961.

Title
Bernadotte was born Prince of Sweden and Duke of Uppland, but having made an unequal match was disqualified from the line of succession. He was also forbidden to use his birth titles and left to be called Mr. Bernadotte. His cousin Lennart Bernadotte, who two years earlier had experienced the same thing (as the first Swede in history), considered himself, and even more so Sigvard, subjected to very cruel treatment for several decades by the Royal Court of Sweden due to their marriages.

On 2 July 1951, for himself, his wife and his marital descendants, Bernadotte was admitted by Grand Duchess Charlotte (head of state at the time) into the nobility of Luxembourg with the title Count of Wisborg. and in that conferral was also called Sigvard Oscar Frederik Prince Bernadotte.

After more than 30 years of argument and controversy in Sweden over his rank and titles, problems which worsened when his father died in 1973, and fed up after having been demonstratively snubbed by the Royal Court of Sweden during a state visit by Queen Elizabeth II in 1983, Bernadotte announced to Tidningarnas Telegrambyrå on 28 May of that year that he was to be known as Prince Sigvard Bernadotte from then on.

Over the years since then, based on precedent established in 1888 for his great-uncle Oscar, and citing Oscar's title of nobility as it was confirmed by the Government of Luxembourg in 1892, Bernadotte was supported by several legal experts when he petitioned for acknowledgement in Sweden of the Prince Bernadotte title as his also, although he did not seek reinstatement in the line of succession to the throne as a royal prince of that country. King Carl XVI Gustaf has been criticized for never obliging and for his consequent estrangement from his uncle.

Bernadotte went to the European Court of Human Rights in an effort to have the Government of Sweden acknowledge his princely title there, but in 2004, after his death, the ECHR declared the application inadmissible.

The wording on his gravestone, at the Royal Cemetery, which is owned by the king, does make it clear that he was "born Prince of Sweden".

From 1994 to 2002, he was the oldest living great-grandchild of Queen Victoria of the United Kingdom, and having reached the age of 94, he was her longest-lived male descendant until being overtaken by his younger brother Carl Johan on 29 June 2011.

Honours and arms

Orders and decorations 
   Commander Grand Cross of the Order of the Polar Star (21 March 1952)
   King Gustaf V's Jubilee Commemorative Medal (1928)
   King Gustaf V's Jubilee Commemorative Medal II (1948)

Arms

Ancestry

See also
 Swedish Act of Succession
 Instrument of Government (1809)

References

External links

 

1907 births
2002 deaths
Artists from Stockholm
Uppland
Swedish memoirists
Sigvard 1907
Swedish industrial designers
Uppsala University alumni
Sigvard
Swedish people of British descent
Sigvard
Disinherited European royalty
Sigvard
Knights of the Order of Charles XIII
Recipients of the Prince Eugen Medal
Sigvard
Sons of kings
20th-century memoirists
Commanders Grand Cross of the Order of the Polar Star